Tomohiro Kuroki (黒木 知宏, born December 13, 1973 in Hyūga, Miyazaki, Japan) is a former Nippon Professional Baseball pitcher.

External links

1973 births
Baseball players at the 2000 Summer Olympics
Chiba Lotte Marines players
Japanese baseball coaches
Living people
Nippon Professional Baseball coaches
Nippon Professional Baseball pitchers
Olympic baseball players of Japan
Baseball people from Miyazaki Prefecture